The Fourth King (German: Der vierte König) is a 2006 German / Swiss / Swedish film directed by Michael Ekbladh and Ted Sieger.

Plot summary

Three wise kings follow a star to Bethlehem to visit a new born baby. This film narrates the story of the fourth king, Mazzel, and his camel, Chamberlin.

Cast
Kevin Whately as Narrator

Soundtrack

Critical reception
The film was honored at the 5th Festival of European Animated Feature Films and TV Specials, where it was awarded the Special Mention of Jury.

References

External links

2006 films
Swedish animated short films
German animated short films
Swiss animated short films
2006 short films
Films based on the Gospels
2000s English-language films
2000s German films
2000s Swedish films